Daystar or day  star may refer to:

 Day Star, 1878 Kentucky Derby winner
 Daystar (album), 2020 album by Tory Lanez
 DayStar Digital, a company that used to manufacture Apple Macintosh clones
 Daystar Productions, see The Outer Limits (1963 TV series)
 Daystar Television Network, an evangelical Christian satellite network
 Daystar University, a Christian liberal arts college located in Kenya
 Daystar, a 2002 album by shoegazing band Lab Partners
 A character in Patricia C. Wrede's Enchanted Forest Chronicles
 A virus created to kill vampires in the movie Blade: Trinity
 Rosalie Mae Jones, Native American dancer and choreographer who performers under the name Daystar
 DAYSTAR: Contemporary Dance-Drama of Indian America, a dance company founded by Rosalie Mae Jones
 Lucifer, a name that in English generally refers to the Devil or Satan
 The Sun
 Venus, as it appears on the morning or evening horizon

See also
Morning Star (disambiguation)